The Eye of Every Storm is the eighth studio album from the Californian band Neurosis. It retains the strong folk music influences prominent on the band's previous album A Sun That Never Sets, while exploring their trudging and massive sound with a more dynamic approach closer to post-rock than their earlier work.

Track listing

Personnel

Neurosis
Steve Von Till : vocals, guitar, filtered and textured sounds
Scott Kelly : vocals, guitar
Noah Landis : organ, piano, synth, sampler, atmospheric sounds and effects
Dave Edwardson : bass, Moog, backing vocals
Jason Roeder : drums, percussion
Josh Graham : visual media

Additional musicians
Desmond Shea : trumpet on "Left to Wander" and "Shelter"
Jeffrey Luck Lucas : cello on "I Can See You"

References

2004 albums
Neurosis (band) albums
Relapse Records albums
Albums produced by Steve Albini